Sandro Vigliano is an Italian former rugby union footballer who played in the 1930s, and 1940s. He played at representative level for Italy (Captain), and at club level for CUS Torino Rugby, and R.S. Ginnastica Torino, as a Flanker, i.e. number 6 or 7.

Playing career

International honours

Sandro Vigliano represented Italy in 1937 against Romania, in the 1937 FIRA Tournament (Captain) against Belgium, Germany, and France, in 1939 against Romania, and in 1942 against Romania.

Club career

Sandro Vigliano was a member of the CUS Torino Rugby team that won the 1936, and 1941 Campionati italiani, and was also a member of the R.S. Ginnastica Torino team that won the 1947 Campionati italiani. In honour of this, Vigliano's name appears alongside his teammates on a plaque affixed to Motovelodromo Fausto Coppi in Turin, the squad was; Ausonio Alacevich, Guido Aleati, Sergio Aleati, Roberto Antonioli, Angelo Arrigoni, Vincenzo Bertolotto, Bianco, Giovanni Bonino, Campi, Gabriele Casalegno, Chiosso, Chiosso, Guido Cornarino, Mario Dotti IV, Aldo Guglielminotti, Pescarmona, Piovano, Rocca, Felice Rama (coach), Siliquini, Giovanni Tamagno, and Sandro Vigliano.

References

Benedetto Pasqua; Mirio Da Roit, Cent'anni di rugby a Torino (One Hundred Years of Rugby in Turin), Torino, Ananke [2011]
Francesco Volpe; Paolo Pacetti, Rugby 2012, Roma, Zesi [2011]
Gianluca Barca; Gian Franco Bellè, La Sesta Nazione (The Sixth Nation), Parma, Grafiche Step [2008]

External links
Search for "Alacevich" at rugbyleagueproject.org

Italian rugby union players
Italy international rugby union players
Place of birth missing (living people)
Possibly living people
Rugby union flankers
Year of birth missing (living people)